Bucktail may refer to:

Bucktails, the name of a political faction in New York State or the 13th Pennsylvania Reserves, an American Civil War unit
Bucktail State Park Natural Area, Pennsylvania
Bucktail, Nebraska, an unincorporated community
Buck-tail, the end opposite the head of a rivet
Bucktail, a type of jig or fishing lure (see jigging)